The following is a list of criminal justice reform organizations in the United States arranged by topic.

General
Alliance for Safety and Justice
American Civil Liberties Union
Amnesty International USA
Anti-Recidivism Coalition
Center for Court Innovation
Charles Hamilton Houston Institute for Race and Justice
Color of Change
Ella Baker Center for Human Rights
FWD.us
Right on Crime
The Marshall Project
Southern Center for Human Rights
Southern Poverty Law Center
Southeast Prison Advocates

Bail reform
The Bronx Freedom Fund

Death penalty reform
Campaign to End the Death Penalty
Conservatives Concerned About the Death Penalty
National Coalition to Abolish the Death Penalty
Witness to Innocence

Exoneration
California Innocence Project
Equal Justice Initiative
Innocence Project
Investigating Innocence
Medill Innocence Project
Nebraska Innocence Project
Northern California Innocence Project

Juvenile justice
Center on Juvenile and Criminal Justice
National Juvenile Defender Center
InsideOUT Writers

Prison and sentencing reform
Californians for Safety and Justice
Coalition for Public Safety
Critical Resistance
Dream Corps JUSTICE
Families Against Mandatory Minimums
Prison Fellowship
Prison Policy Initiative
Right On Crime
The Sentencing Project
Survived and Punished
Vera Institute of Justice

Probation and parole reform
Louisiana Parole Project
REFORM Alliance
Right on Crime

School-to-Prison Pipeline
Marshall-Brennan Constitutional Literacy Project
Street Law

References

Legal advocacy organizations in the United States
Political advocacy groups in the United States
Organizations
United States
Lists of organizations based in the United States